WMF Junior Heavyweight Championship was a junior heavyweight title in the Japanese independent promotion Wrestling Marvelous Future (WMF). It was the primary championship in WMF and the only title defended in the promotion throughout its history. The inaugural champion was determined via a single elimination tournament in 2003. The title was disbanded in 2005 after the promotion suffered financial loss.

Inaugural tournament

Title history

References

External links
WMF Junior Heavyweight Championship title history at Wrestlingdata
WMF Junior Heavyweight Championship title history at Cagematch
WMF Junior Heavyweight Championship title history at FMW Wrestling
WMF Junior Heavyweight Championship title history at Wrestling-titles

Junior heavyweight wrestling championships